Yusuf Halaçoğlu (born 10 May 1949, in Kozan, Adana) is a Turkish historian and politician. He is a former president of the Turkish Historical Society and was a member of the Turkish Parliament from 2011 to 2017 representing the electoral district of Kayseri for the Nationalist Movement Party (MHP) and from 2017 for the Good Party.

He studied history at Istanbul University and pursued an academic career at the same university after graduating in 1974. In 1983, he became an assistant professor. Halaçoğlu entered Marmara University in 1986, and in 1989 he was appointed a professor. After serving in leading positions at the Turkish State Archives, he returned to the university in 1992. From 1993 on, he served as the chairman of the Turkish Historical Society until his dismissal in 2008. He then returned to his chair at Gazi University.

In the 2011 general election, Halaçoğlu was elected into parliament, and was reelected in June and November 2015. In November 2015, the MHP nominated him for Parliamentary Speaker, where he finished on fourth place. In 2017 he left the MHP to be a founding member of a new party, the Good Party. He was deselected as a candidate for the 2018 Election After the 2018 elections, he resigned from the Good Party.

Views 
Halaçoğlu is a well-known researcher on Armenian genocide and has authored several works that mitigate the suffering the Armenians underwent during World War I. He also preferred the term relocation to deportation, as the displacement had taken place within one the same state, the Ottoman Empire. He places the number of deaths during the deportations, which he calls "forced relocations", at no higher than 9,000-10,000 (as opposed to the 600,000 to 1,500,000 that is widely stated by those who acknowledge the genocide). His views are parallel to the official Turkish state thesis according to which the massacres and death marches did not constitute genocide. He compared it to the relocations the USA undertook with the Japanese during World War II. His research has been criticized by such scholars as Taner Akçam. In 2008 Halaçoğlu was dismissed from his post as the head of the Turkish Historical Society for his controversial claims about Armenians and Kurds. In regards to Kurds he denied the Kurd referred to an own ethnicity in Ottoman times, but that this was used as a general denomination for the nomads.

In the year 2004 he was prosecuted in Winterthur, Switzerland after he denied the Armenian genocide in a speech he held at the Turkish Association in Winterthur.

In 2007, Halaçoğlu claimed that he had a list of crypto-Armenians living in Turkey and threatened to publish it. He also claimed that the Dersim Alevis are Armenian.

References

External links 
 Tribes of Anatolia, about the author (in Turkish)
 Grand National Assembly of Turkey, list of deputies (in Turkish)
 https://twitter.com/yusufhalacoglu

1949 births
Deniers of the Armenian genocide
Living people
20th-century Turkish historians
People from Kozan, Adana
Deputies of Kayseri
Nationalist Movement Party politicians
Istanbul University alumni
Academic staff of Marmara University
Academic staff of Gazi University
Members of the 25th Parliament of Turkey
Members of the 24th Parliament of Turkey
Members of the 26th Parliament of Turkey
Ethnic Afshar people
Former Good Party politicians
21st-century Turkish historians